is a town located in Kanagawa Prefecture, Japan. , the town had an estimated population of 10,514 and a population density of 280 persons per km².

Geography
Matsuda is located in hilly western Kanagawa Prefecture. The Sakawa River, Kawaoto River, Nakatsu River and their tributaries form the outline of the town. In the north, the 1,200m-class high peaks of the Nishi-Tanzawa Mountains, with parts of the town within the borders of the Tanzawa-Ōyama Quasi-National Park.

Surrounding municipalities
Kanagawa Prefecture
Hadano
Minamiashigara
Kaisei, Yamakita, Ōi

Climate
Matsuda has a Humid subtropical climate (Köppen Cfa) characterized by warm summers and cool winters with light to no snowfall.  The average annual temperature in Matsuda is 12.5 °C. The average annual rainfall is 2144 mm with September as the wettest month. The temperatures are highest on average in August, at around 23.5 °C, and lowest in January, at around 1.6 °C.

Demographics
Per Japanese census data, the population of Matsuda peaked in around 1990 and has been declining since.

History
During the Edo period area around present-day Matsuda was part of Odawara Domain in Sagami Province. After the Meiji Restoration, it became part of Ashigarakami District in Kanagawa Prefecture. On April 1, 1889 Ashikagakami District was administratively divided into several villages, including the villages of Yadoriki and Matsuda, with the establishment of the modern municipalities system. The growth of Matsuda was favored by the opening of Matsuda Station the same year, and it attained town status on April 1, 1909. Shin-Matsuda Station opened in 1927. On April 1, 1955, Yadoriki merged into Matsuda. A new town charter was promulgated in 1989, leading to the "Matsuda Plan 21" in the year 2001.

Government
Matsuda has a mayor-council form of government with a directly elected mayor and a unicameral town council of 12 members. Matsuda, together with the other municipalities in Ashigarakami District and Minamiashigara city, collectively contributes one member to the Kanagawa Prefectural Assembly. In terms of national politics, the town is part of Kanagawa 17th district of the lower house of the Diet of Japan.

Education
Matsuda has two public elementary schools and two public middle schools operated by the town government. The town does not have any public high school, but there is one private high school.

Transportation

Rail
 JR Tokai – Gotemba Line

 Odakyū Odawara Line

Highway
 (Ōi-Matsuda Interchange)

Local attractions
Some local attractions include Sakawa River fishing, Tanzawa Mountain Range hiking, paragliding and camping, and blueberry, tangerine and sweet potato harvesting.  Other attractions include the local matsuri, the Matsudayama Herb Garden, Children's Museum, Nature Hall, the ridable miniature railway, the Yadoriki Petting Zoo & Dog Park, Yadoriki Fishing Area, two golf courses, and the Matsuda Health & Welfare Center onsen.

Events
Matsuda Sakura Festival (late February)
Wakaba Festival (May 5)
Herb Festival (June and October)
Yadoriki Hotaru (Firefly) Festival (June)
Matsuda Tourism Festival (August)
Emmei Temple Festival (December 28)

Sister city relations
 Yokoshibahikari, Chiba, Japan, from November 3, 2003

References

External links

Official Website 

 
Towns in Kanagawa Prefecture